Khagen Murmu (born 2 February 1960) is an Indian politician and a Member of Parliament from Maldaha Uttar. He is a member of the Bharatiya Janata Party from West Bengal. He has served four terms as a MLA from Habibpur constituency as member of CPIM from 2001 to 2019.

Personal life
Murmu was born on 2 February 1960 to Jalo Murmu and Sakro Hembrom in Shekhpar of Malda district in the state of West Bengal. He completed his graduation in Bachelor of Arts from Magadh University, Patna. Murmu married Manju Kisku on 10 May 1985, with whom he has three sons and a daughter. Murmu is also a social worker.

Political career
Murmu is a Santhali leader. He was first elected from Habibpur constituency as member of CPIM in 2001. In 2019 he joined Bharatiya Janata Party and was selected for Lok Sabha 2019 Indian general election from Maldaha Uttar (Lok Sabha constituency).

References

External links
Khagen Murmu - Members Bioprofile

1960 births
Living people
India MPs 2019–present
Lok Sabha members from West Bengal
Communist Party of India (Marxist) politicians from West Bengal
Bharatiya Janata Party politicians from West Bengal
People from English Bazar
West Bengal MLAs 2006–2011
West Bengal MLAs 2011–2016
West Bengal MLAs 2016–2021